The action of 29 April 1616 took place near Euboea when a Tuscan galley force defeated a similar Turkish force.

Six Tuscan galleys, under Montauto, had left Livorno at the end of March 1616.  On 29 April, they met 6 Turkish galleys near Euboea and captured the 2 flag-galleys.  The remaining 4 fled.  The galley San Francesco was damaged and took no part.  Tuscan casualties were 32 killed and 312 wounded.

References

1616 in Italy
1616
1616
Conflicts in 1616
1616 in the Ottoman Empire
History of Euboea